This is a List of stations of the Mumbai Suburban Railway, a suburban rail system serving the Mumbai Metropolitan Region in Maharashtra, India.The Mumbai Suburban Railway was opened on 16 April 1853. The system is operated by Western Railway and Central Railway. Each route contains "slow" and "fast" tracks. "Slow" tracks are dedicated tracks for suburban trains, while "fast" tracks are shared with long-distance trains operated by Indian Railways. Some railway stations on the network serve both suburban as well as long-distance trains.

The Mumbai Suburban Railway comprises a major 6 line – Western Line, Central Line, Harbour Line, Trans-Harbour Line, Nerul–Uran line and Vasai Road–Roha line. Each of these corridors may consist of additional lines that may intersect with each other. The system uses rolling stock of broad gauge and consists of completely at-grade lines. The railway system is open from 4 am to 1 am and has an average daily ridership of 7.24 million commuters.

Stations

Notes

External links
Mumbai Suburban Stations on Western Railway

 
Lists of railway stations in India
Suburban Railway stations